Lewenhaupt is the name of an old Swedish noble family, whose members occupied significant military and political positions in the Kingdom of Sweden.

History 
Lewenhaput is the Germanized name of the Swedish Leijonhufvud noble family. They were granted baronial title in Sweden. The baronial branch was 1568 granted the title of Count. Branches of the family still exist in Sweden.

Notable members 
 Gustaf Adolf Lewenhaupt (1619–1656), Swedish soldier
 Adam Ludwig Lewenhaupt (1659–1719), Swedish general
 Charles Emil Lewenhaupt (1691–1743), Swedish general
 Wilhelmina Bonde, née Lewenhaupt (1817–1899), Swedish courtier
 Carl Lewenhaupt (1835–1906), Swedish diplomat and politician
 Carl Gustaf Sixtensson Lewenhaupt (1879–1962), Swedish horse rider and modern pentathlete
 Carl Gustaf Moritz Thure Lewenhaupt (1884–1935), Swedish horse rider who competed in the 1920 Summer Olympics
 Carl Adam Lewenhaupt (1947–2017), Swedish count